The Leaf Project is a group robot development program whose objective is to develop a robot platform that supports experiments with artificial intelligence, vision, navigation, etc. 

Leaf was created by Bruce Weimer, Alex Brown, and Robin Hewitt. It is an artificial life program, inspired by Steve Grand's computer game Creatures, in which artificial beings hatch, develop, and interact in a simulated environment. A PC (software-only) version of Leaf was demonstrated in 2003, and construction of the first robot began in early 2004.

Overview 
Leaf:
 has an artificial personality
 is an open source project
 responds to spoken commands
 responds to visual information
 can be used with just a PC
 can be interfaced with a robot through his own circuit board
 is programmed in LISP
 can use a CSLU Toolkit animated face
 uses Robin Hewitt's webcam implementation for vision
 can be completely customized and users are encouraged to customize and improve him
 software is currently used in an R2-D2 replica
 has a hardware/ electronic platform created by Alex Brown that supports basic mobility, sensing, and control from an on-board PC

Three Leaf robots were completed in 2004 and four more were built in 2006.

External links
 The Leaf Project home page
 The Leaf Project Yahoo Group
 Wikibooks: Programming AI with Leaf

AI software
Robotics projects
2003 in robotics